Cryptocellus goodnighti is an arachnid species in the genus Cryptocellus. It occurs in Costa Rica.

References

External links 
 
 

Arthropods of Central America
Ricinulei
Animals described in 1981